Burnt Ranch is a census-designated place (CDP) in Trinity County, California. It has a school and a post office. Its ZIP Code is 95527, and it is in area code 530. Its population is 250 as of the 2020 census, down from 281 from the 2010 census.

History
In prehistoric times, the area was inhabited by people speaking a form of the Chimariko language, which was spoken along the Trinity River from the mouth of South Fork at Salyer as far upstream as Big Bar; their principal village was at present-day Burnt Ranch. Pre-contact, the Native American people of this area all spoke Chimariko as well as a dialect of the Hupa language. This is the Tsnungwe dialect of Hupa.

Burnt Ranch is so named because Canadian miners burned down an Indian rancheria here in 1849.

On 2 August 1858, J.W. Winslet's party of 16 men from Burnt Ranch were ambushed by the Whilkut in the Bald Hills along a trail to the Hupa villages, killing one man and wounding Winslet; the party retreated to Pardee's Ranch.

Burnt Ranch was destroyed in the spring of 1863 by an Indian raiding party.
"On the Trinity, for many miles above its confluence with the Klamath, there were indications of a general uprising of discontented tribes. At Cedar Flat a trading post was attacked and destroyed, the keeper and another man escaping to Burnt Ranch. The family at Burnt Ranch was removed to a safer locality, and none too soon; one day thereafter the Indians arrived and set fire to everything that would burn."
  
Burnt Ranch became a temporary camp from May to November 1864, used by 1st Battalion California Volunteer Mountaineers while moving Indians to Fort Humboldt.

Geography
The town is 15.7 miles southeast of Willow Creek on State Route 299.

Climate
This region experiences hot and dry summers. According to the Köppen Climate Classification system, Burnt Ranch has a warm-summer Mediterranean climate, abbreviated "Csb" on climate maps.

Demographics

The 2010 United States Census reported that Burnt Ranch had a population of 281. The population density was 21.0 people per square mile (8.1/km2). The racial makeup of Burnt Ranch was 241 (85.8%) White, 0 (0.0%) African American, 15 (5.3%) Native American, 4 (1.4%) Asian, 0 (0.0%) Pacific Islander, 1 (0.4%) from other races, and 20 (7.1%) from two or more races. Hispanic or Latino of any race were 19 persons (6.8%).

The Census reported that 281 people (100% of the population) lived in households, 0 (0%) lived in non-institutionalized group quarters, and 0 (0%) were institutionalized.

There were 129 households, out of which 22 (17.1%) had children under the age of 18 living in them, 62 (48.1%) were opposite-sex married couples living together, 7 (5.4%) had a female householder with no husband present, 4 (3.1%) had a male householder with no wife present. There were 6 (4.7%) unmarried opposite-sex partnerships, and 2 (1.6%) same-sex married couples or partnerships. 48 households (37.2%) were made up of individuals, and 14 (10.9%) had someone living alone who was 65 years of age or older. The average household size was 2.18. There were 73 families (56.6% of all households); the average family size was 2.88.

The population was spread out, with 38 people (13.5%) under the age of 18, 12 people (4.3%) aged 18 to 24, 53 people (18.9%) aged 25 to 44, 119 people (42.3%) aged 45 to 64, and 59 people (21.0%) who were 65 years of age or older. The median age was 52.1 years. For every 100 females, there were 124.8 males. For every 100 females age 18 and over, there were 127.1 males.

There were 157 housing units at an average density of 11.7 per square mile (4.5/km2), of which 106 (82.2%) were owner-occupied, and 23 (17.8%) were occupied by renters. The homeowner vacancy rate was 0%; the rental vacancy rate was 8.0%. 230 people (81.9% of the population) lived in owner-occupied housing units and 51 people (18.1%) lived in rental housing units.

Politics

See also
Trinity County, California

References

Settlements formerly in Klamath County, California
Census-designated places in Trinity County, California
Census-designated places in California